Facundo Callioni (born 9 October 1985) is an Argentine field hockey player. At the 2012 Summer Olympics, he competed for the national team in the men's tournament. Facundo won the bronze medal at the 2014 Men's Hockey World Cup and the gold medal at the 2015 Pan American Games, in Toronto, Ontario, Canada.

He won a gold medal in the 2016 Summer Olympics in Rio de Janeiro, where the Argentina men's national field hockey team defeated  Belgium 4–2 in the final match.

References

External links
 

1985 births
Living people
Argentine male field hockey players
Field hockey players from Buenos Aires
Field hockey players at the 2012 Summer Olympics
Olympic field hockey players of Argentina
Argentine people of Italian descent
Field hockey players at the 2015 Pan American Games
Field hockey players at the 2016 Summer Olympics
Olympic gold medalists for Argentina
Olympic medalists in field hockey
Medalists at the 2016 Summer Olympics
Pan American Games medalists in field hockey
Pan American Games gold medalists for Argentina
Medalists at the 2015 Pan American Games
2010 Men's Hockey World Cup players
Men's Belgian Hockey League players
21st-century Argentine people